Rearquhar is a township, which lies in the valley of the River Evelix, 4 miles northwest from Dornoch, in Sutherland, Scottish Highlands and is in the Scottish council area of Highland.

Populated places in Sutherland